The 1975 ICF Canoe Sprint World Championships were held in Belgrade, Yugoslavia for the second time, having hosted them in 1971. This also equaled the most times a city had done so with Copenhagen, Denmark (1950, 1970).

The men's competition consisted of six Canadian (single paddle, open boat) and nine kayak events. Three events were held for the women, all in kayak.

This was the twelfth championships in canoe sprint. It marked the first time in the championships' history in which there was tie for a medal and that happened to be for the gold in the men's K-1 1000 m event between Italy's Oreste Perri and Poland's Grzegorz Śledziewski. The second would occur thirty-five years later in the C-1 200 m (debuted 1994) for the bronze between Canada's Richard Dalton and Ukraine's Yuriy Cheban, neither of who were born in 1975.

Medal summary

Men's

Canoe

Kayak

Women's

Kayak

Medals table

References
ICF medalists for Olympic and World Championships - Part 1: flatwater (now sprint): 1936-2007.
ICF medalists for Olympic and World Championships - Part 2: rest of flatwater (now sprint) and remaining canoeing disciplines: 1936-2007.

Icf Canoe Sprint World Championships, 1975
Icf Canoe Sprint World Championships, 1975
ICF Canoe Sprint World Championships
International sports competitions hosted by Yugoslavia
Canoeing and kayaking competitions in Yugoslavia